Bomani is a ward in Tarime District, Mara Region of northern Tanzania, East Africa. In 2016 the Tanzania National Bureau of Statistics report there were 10,113 people in the ward, from 9,165 in 2012.

Villages / neighborhoods 
The ward has 7 villages.
 Anglikana
 Biambwi
 Bomani
 Buhemba
 Magereza
 Mawasiliano
 NHC

References

Tarime District
Mara Region